The Kyocera Echo (sometimes referred to as Sprint Echo) is a smartphone manufactured by Kyocera of Japan, and distributed by Sprint in the United States. It runs the Google Android operating system. It was announced by Sprint on 7 February 2011, and released for sale 17 April 2011.

It is unusual in having two 3.5-inch screens that, when juxtaposed in "tablet mode" create one 4.7-inch screen. Sprint claims it as the "first dual-screen smart phone". When using the device, the screens can be used in four modes:

 Tablet mode, where the two screens form one 4.7" image.
 Optimized mode, where each screen shows a different part of one application. For example, one can open up "optimized applications" on the device such as email, where the top screen shows a selected email message and the bottom screen shows the user inbox.
 "Simul-Task" mode, where one application will run on the top screen while a separate application runs on the bottom screen.
 Single-Screen mode, where the device is folded and the bottom screen is concealed, making only the top primary 3.5-inch screen usable.

References

External links

Kyocera mobile phones
Android (operating system) devices
Smartphones